Gerhard Hennige (born 23 September 1940) is a retired German sprinter. He won a silver medal in the 400 m hurdles at the 1968 Olympics, setting a European record in the semifinals. He was also part of the 4 × 400 m West German teams that finished third at the 1968 Olympics and 1969 European Championships. In 1967 he won the European Cup in the 400 m hurdles, and in 1968 he was awarded the Silbernes Lorbeerblatt.

Hennige was known for wearing very dark sunglasses while competing. In retirement he became a full-time teacher at the Technical University of Darmstadt. In 1997 he was the conditioning coach for Formula One racer Michael Schumacher. His daughter Christine competed nationally as a middle-distance runner.

References

External links
 Leverkusen who's who

German male hurdlers
German male sprinters
Olympic athletes of West Germany
Athletes (track and field) at the 1968 Summer Olympics
1940 births
Living people
Sportspeople from Karlsruhe
People from the Republic of Baden
European Athletics Championships medalists
Medalists at the 1968 Summer Olympics
Olympic silver medalists for West Germany
Olympic bronze medalists for West Germany
Olympic silver medalists in athletics (track and field)
Olympic bronze medalists in athletics (track and field)

Technische Universität Darmstadt alumni